XSP may refer to:
 XSP (software), an ASP.NET server
 eXtensible Server Pages, a language in Apache Cocoon
 The IATA airport code of Seletar Airport, Singapore
 Experimental Spaceplane (XSP) project previously known as XS-1